The Flute Concert of Sanssouci is a 1930 German drama film directed by Gustav Ucicky and starring Otto Gebühr. It was part of the popular cycle of Prussian films. It was made at the Babelsberg Studios. The film's sets were designed by the art director Robert Herlth and Walter Röhrig. Location filming took place around the Berlin area including at the Sanssouci Palace in Potsdam.

Plot 
In 1756, a masked ball was officially celebrated in the Dresden Palais of the Saxon Minister Heinrich von Brühl. Unofficially, however, talks are taking place with the envoys of Austria, Russia and France with the aim of conspiring against the Prussian King Frederick II. The Prussian envoy, Major von Lindeneck, noticed this incident and succeeded in bringing a copy of the concluded secret treaty to the Prussian king. Friedrich consults with his generals, who urge caution. Friedrich is stunned by the reaction and now develops a counter-plan. To do this, he sends von Lindeneck back to Dresden. However, the latter is not very enthusiastic about this, as he thinks he has reason to doubt his wife Blanche's marital fidelity, and he now has to leave her alone. But loyalty to the king is more important to him and he carries out all the orders of the Prussian king. When the envoys of Austria, Russia and France ask for an audience with Friedrich, he gives a flute concerto to gain time.  (This event is based on a famous picture by Adolph von Menzel.) In the course of this concert he receives a telegram from Vienna which completely uncovers the plot. He ends the concert and has the envoy hand over the declaration of war. He goes outside and announces that he has just given marching orders for the regiments. The Seven Years' War begins.

Cast
 Otto Gebühr as Friedrich II
 Renate Müller as Blanche von Lindeneck
 Hans Rehmann as Major von Lindeneck
 Walter Janssen as Maltzahn
 Raoul Aslan as Heinrich von Brühl
 Friedrich Kayßler as Count Karl-Wilhelm Finck von Finckenstein
 Carl Goetz as Michael Gabriel Fredersdorf
 Aribert Wäscher as Poellnitz
 Margarete Schön as Princess Amalie
 Theodor Loos as Menzel
 Hans Brausewetter as Correspondent
 Paul Biensfeldt as Johann Joachim Quantz
 Vladimir Sokoloff as Russian Envoy
 Friedrich Kühne as Schwerin
 Alfred Beierle as Wolf Frederick von Retzow
 Georg John as Ziethen
 Theo Lingen as Kent

References

Bibliography

External links

1930 films
1930 drama films
1930s historical drama films
1930s German-language films
Films of the Weimar Republic
German historical drama films
German black-and-white films
Films directed by Gustav Ucicky
Films set in 1756
Films set in the Kingdom of Prussia
Biographical films about German royalty
Cultural depictions of Frederick the Great
Prussian films
Seven Years' War films
UFA GmbH films
Films shot at Babelsberg Studios
1930s German films